Różanna may refer to the following places:
Różanna, Bydgoszcz County in Kuyavian-Pomeranian Voivodeship (north-central Poland)
Różanna, Świecie County in Kuyavian-Pomeranian Voivodeship (north-central Poland)
Różanna, Łódź Voivodeship (central Poland)
Różanna, Masovian Voivodeship (east-central Poland)
Różanna, Greater Poland Voivodeship (west-central Poland)